Padenia duplicana is a moth of the subfamily Arctiinae. It was described by Francis Walker in 1863. It is found in Myanmar and on Borneo, Sumatra, Java and the Philippines. The habitat consists of various lowland forest types.

References

Lithosiini
Moths described in 1863